There are several stadiums in Romania with the name Stadionul Victoria:

 Stadionul Victoria (Vânju Mare)
 Stadionul Victoria (București), renamed Stadionul Florea Dumitrache.
 Stadionul Victoria-Cetate
 Stadionul Victoria Someșeni